Nutation is a rocking, swaying, or nodding motion in the axis of rotation of a largely axially symmetric object, such as a gyroscope or the Earth (see astronomical nutation).
It may also refer to:
 In biology:
 Nutation (botany), bending movements executed by some plant organs
 In human anatomy, movement of the sacrum vis-a-vis the ilia
 The same as precession in spacecraft dynamics
 Nutation (engineering)